Tim Dantay (born 1963) is a British actor who was born in Southern Rhodesia (now Zimbabwe) and brought up in the Lake District.

Filmography

Theatre work
 Four Nights in Knaresborough (UK tour, 2001)

External links

Living people
Male actors from Manchester
English male stage actors
English male television actors
1963 births